Urmia Masis FC, is defunct Armenian football club from Masis, Ararat Province. The club dissolved in early 1994 due to financial difficulties.

League Record

References

Urmia Masis
1994 disestablishments in Armenia